The Steamboat River is a stream in Cass County, Minnesota, in the United States.  The Steamboat River was so named from the fact steamboats navigated this stream.

References

Rivers of Cass County, Minnesota
Rivers of Minnesota